Malcolm Dixon may refer to

 Malcolm Dixon (1899–1985), English biochemist
 Malcolm Dixon (actor) (1934–2020), English actor
 Malcolm Dixon (rugby league) (born 1939), English rugby league footballer